José Barrientos (18 March 1904 – 27 September 1945) was a Cuban sprinter. He competed in the men's 100 metres at the 1928 Summer Olympics. He died in a plane crash. The Barrientos Memorial was created following his death and is the oldest athletics tournament in the Caribbean.

References

External links
 

1904 births
1945 deaths
Athletes (track and field) at the 1928 Summer Olympics
Cuban male sprinters
Olympic athletes of Cuba
Place of birth missing
Victims of aviation accidents or incidents in the United States
Victims of aviation accidents or incidents in 1945
20th-century Cuban people